Anabura or Anaboura or Anabora (Αναβωρα) may refer to:
Anabura (Phrygia), which may have later been the site of:
 Augustopolis in Phrygia, Ancient city, former bishopric and Latin Catholic titular see in Phrygia, near Surmeneh (modern Sürmene)
 Çobanlar, town and district of Afyonkarahisar Province in the Aegean region of Turkey
Anabura (Pisidia)